The Puthia Raj family was created by the Mughals in the early seventeenth century and is one of the oldest feudal estates of Bengal. A lord named Nilambar received the title of Raja (King) from the Emperor Jahangir (reigned 1605-1627 CE). In 1744, the region was divided between King Nilambar's sons and the Puthia Raj family was born. The family built lavish palaces and temples, such as the Puthia Temple Complex, and were noted philanthropists. Later the Puthia Raj estate was maintained by Lahiris until the abolition of the zamindari system under the newly formed democratic Government of East Pakistan after passing of the East Bengal State Acquisition and Tenancy Act of 1950, just two years after the fall of the British Raj. The palaces are currently administered by the Government of Bangladesh.

Notable members 
 Saratsundari Devi
 Hemanta Kumari Debi

References

External links 
 Temples of Puthia

Rajshahi District
1950 disestablishments in Pakistan
Zamindari estates
Quasi-princely estates of India
Bengali zamindars
1612 establishments in India
Hindu families
Bengali Hindus
Bangladeshi Hindus